TZero may refer to:

 AC Propulsion tzero, automobile
 T Zero, a collection of stories by Italo Calvino
 t0, a symbol used in mathematics referring to the starting point or the beginning of time within a system